Mecyclothorax blackburni is a species of ground beetle in the subfamily Psydrinae. It was described by Sloane in 1898.

References

blackburni
Beetles described in 1898